The Boys of Baraka is a 2005 documentary film produced and directed by filmmakers Heidi Ewing and Rachel Grady. The documentary follows twenty boys from Baltimore, Maryland who spend their seventh and eighth grade years at a rural boarding school in northern Kenya.

It premiered at the South by Southwest Film Festival in 2005, where it won the Special Jury Award for Documentary Feature.  It was released theatrically in 2006 by ThinkFilms. The film also won  a Gold Hugo at the 2005 Chicago Film Festival for Best Documentary and an NAACP Image Award  for Outstanding Independent or Foreign Film.  The film was shortlisted for the 2006 Academy Awards. and nominated for an Emmy for Outstanding Informational Programming.

Synopsis

Twenty “at risk” 12-year-old boys from inner-city Baltimore leave home to attend the 7th and 8th grade at Baraka, an experimental boarding school located in Kenya, East Africa. Here, faced with a strict academic and disciplinary program as well as the freedom to be normal teenage boys, these brave kids began the daunting journey towards putting their lives on a fresh path.

The Boys of Baraka  focuses on four boys: Devon, Montrey, Richard and his brother Romesh. Their humor and explicit truthfulness give intimate insight into their optimistic plans, despite the tremendous obstacles they face both at home and in school. Through extensive time with the boys in Baltimore and in Africa, the film captures the kids’ amazing journey and how they fare when they are forced to return to the difficult realities of their city. The film zeros in on kids that society has given up on–boys with every disadvantage, but who refuse to be cast off as “throw-aways.”

Background 
Founded by the private Abell Foundation in 1996, the Baraka School — "baraka" means "blessing" in Kiswahili, the native spoken language of eastern Africa — was designed to give "at-risk" African-American boys from Baltimore a chance to learn academically and grow personally in an environment far removed from their troubled neighborhoods. Without television, Game Boys and fast food, and exposed to the hardworking and socially rich life of rural Africans, the boys are given a more disciplined structure and the kind of educational attention (a five-to-one student-teacher ratio) normally reserved for better-heeled private schools.
 
The Boys of Baraka is a co-production of the Independent Television Service (ITVS), produced in association with American Documentary | POV . The film was released theatrically in 2006 by the now defunct ThinkFilm.

References

External links
 
Film Review on AALBC.com
Additional Scenes on PBS.org
Update on the Boys on PBS.org
Loki Films

2005 films
American documentary films
Films shot in Baltimore
Films shot in Kenya
POV (TV series) films
Documentary films about children
Documentary films about education
Education in Baltimore
Education in Kenya
2005 documentary films
Films directed by Heidi Ewing and Rachel Grady
2005 directorial debut films
2000s English-language films
2000s American films